Borna Ćorić was the defending champion, having won the event in 2013, but elevated to Men's Singles instead as a qualifier.

Omar Jasika won the title, defeating Quentin Halys in the final, 2–6, 7–5, 6–1.

Seeds

Main draw

Finals

Top half

Section 1

Section 2

Bottom half

Section 3

Section 4

External links 
 Main draw

Boys' Singles
US Open, 2014 Boys' Singles